Santiago Saint-Upery (born 31 October 2000) is a Uruguayan swimmer. He competed in the men's 100 metre breaststroke event at the 2017 World Aquatics Championships.

References

External links
 

2000 births
Living people
Uruguayan male swimmers
Place of birth missing (living people)
Swimmers at the 2018 Summer Youth Olympics
Male breaststroke swimmers
21st-century Uruguayan people